Cecile Gray Bazelon (born September 25, 1927) is an American painter living in New York City. Bazelon is best known for her perspectives of unpeopled New York cityscapes, and her depictions of interior spaces framed in geometric patterns.

Early life 

Bazelon was born in Cleveland, Ohio. She graduated from Syracuse University in 1949 and was awarded the Graduate Fellowship in Painting.

Career 
Bazelon's early work focused on landscapes that include architectural elements and interiors. Bazelon often set these scenes against intensely patterned decorative borders—a stylistic device that became an integral part of her work. In 1969, Bazelon received a fellowship at the renowned Yaddo artists’ colony in Saratoga Springs, NY. Several years later, the artist held her first solo exhibition in New York City at the Robert Schoelkopf Gallery in 1971. Over the next few decades, Bazelon would be the subject of numerous one-person shows and group exhibitions held at the Museum of Modern Art, Corcoran Gallery of Art, Smithsonian Design Museum, and others. Her work resides in numerous collections internationally.

Personal life 
In 1953, Bazelon moved to New York City, where she met and subsequently married the late American composer Irwin Bazelon in 1960.

Selected solo exhibitions 
 2015 The Prints and Drawings of Cecile Gray Bazelon, Palitz Gallery, Syracuse University, New York
 2013 Between the Spaces: Works by Cecile Gray Bazelon, Sue and Leon Genet Gallery at The Warehouse, Syracuse University, Syracuse, New York
 2008 Country and City Sites, Ezair Gallery, New York City
 1995 Me, Botero and City Sites, Katharina Rich Perlow Gallery, New York City
 1992 New Paintings: Central Park Series, Katharina Rich Perlow Gallery
 1992 Portraits of Contemporary Women, Elaine Benson Gallery, Bridgehampton, New York
 1988 Cecile Gray Bazelon: Recent Paintings, Katharina Rich Perlow Gallery, New York City
 1980 Cecile Gray Bazelon, AM Sachs Gallery, New York City
 1979 Cecile Gray Bazelon, Paintings, Elaine Benson Gallery, Bridgehampton, New York
 1975 Cecile Gray Bazelon, Robert Schoelkopf Gallery, New York City
 1973 Cecile Gray Bazelon, Robert Schoelkopf Gallery
 1971 Cecile Gray Bazelon, Robert Schoelkopf Gallery

Selected group exhibitions
 1995 Arnold Hoffman and the Art of the Print, Museum at Stony Brook, Stony Brook, New York
 1994-93 West Collection: Art and the Law, Kennedy Galleries, New York City. Traveled to: Loyola Law School, Los Angeles, California; James R. Thompson Center, Chicago, Illinois; and the Minnesota Museum of American Art, St. Paul, Minnesota
 1993 Arnold Hoffman—The Screen Print Workshop, Bill Bace Gallery, Southampton, New York
Katharina Rich Perlow Gallery, New York City
 1992-91 West Collection: Art and the Law, Haggerty Museum of Art, Marquette University, Milwaukee, Wisconsin. Traveled to: Woodruff Art Center, Atlanta, Georgia; and the Minnesota Museum of American Art, St. Paul
 1991 Katharina Rich Perlow Gallery, New York City
 1990 Lehman College of Art Gallery, New York City
Katharina Rich Perlow Gallery
 1989 Architectural Themes in Art, Nabisco Brand Gallery, East Hanover, New Jersey
 1988 Albright-Knox Art Gallery, Members Gallery, Buffalo, New York
Columbus Museum, Members Gallery, Columbus, OhioKatharina Rich Perlow Gallery
 1987 Albright-Knox Art Gallery, Members Gallery
Baltimore Museum of Art, Collectors Gallery, Baltimore, MarylandColumbus Museum, Members Gallery, Columbus, OhioKatharina Rich Perlow Gallery
 1986 Baltimore Museum of Art, Collectors Gallery
 1985 The Museum at Stony Brook, Stony Brook, New York
 1981 & 1983 Arbitrage Gallery, Ltd., New York City
Out of New York, Root Art Center, Hamilton College, Clinton, New York
 1979 Butler Museum, Youngstown, Ohio
 1978 Artists’ Postcard Series II, Cooper-Hewitt Museum, The Smithsonian Institution’s National Museum of Design, New York City. Traveled to various venues across Europe.
 1975 Color, Light, and Image: International Women’s Show, Women's Interart Center, New York City
 1974 Corcoran Gallery of Art, Washington, D.C.
 1972 Landscapes, The Museum of Modern Art, New York City

Awards and fellowships
 1993 West Publishing Purchase Award
 1991 West Publishing Purchase Award
 1969 Yaddo Fellowship, Saratoga Springs, New York
 1949 Graduate Fellowship in Painting, Syracuse University, Syracuse, New York

Public collections
 American Income Properties, Los Angeles, California
 Bristol Myers-Squibb, Princeton, New Jersey
 CitiBank, New York City
 Southampton College, Southampton, New York
 West Publishing Company, Eagan, Minnesota
 Syracuse University Art Collection, Syracuse, New York

Selected book, magazine, CD and album covers 
 2003 Jones, Kaylie. Speak Now, Akashic Books, New York City 2003. [Book Cover: Orange Sky, 1995].
Music of Irwin Bazelon, Albany Records, Albany, New York [CD Cover: Night Sky Over Lexington, 1994].
 2000 Music of Irwin Bazelon, Albany Records. [CD Cover: Between the Spaces, 1995].
 1999 Music of Irwin Bazelon, Albany Records. [CD Cover: Summer Studio, 1997].
 1998 Music of Irwin Bazelon, Albany Records. [CD Cover: Split Tree, 1991].
 1993 Music of Irwin Bazelon, Albany Records. [CD Cover: Winterset II, 1993].
 1992 Music of Irwin Bazelon, Albany Records. [CD Cover: Red Stairs, 1985].
West Publishing Company: 1992 Calendar, Eagan, MN. [Book Cover: Winterset, 1990].
 1977 DeLillo, Don. Players, Alfred A. Knopf, New York City, 1977. [Book Cover: Blue Surrounded, 1972].
 1976 Wilson Library Bulletin, Bronx, New York, May 1976. [Magazine Cover: Madison Square Park, 1973].
 1973 Partch, Harry. The Bewitched, Composers Recordings, Inc., New York City. [Album Cover: Stairway Unto Infinity, 1972].
 1970 Bazelon, Irwin. Symphony No. 5, Composers Recordings, Inc. [Album Cover: Woodcut of Composer, 1970].

Selected bibliography
 Battcock, Gregory, ed. Super Realism: A Critical Anthology. New York: E.P. Dutton & Co., 1975, pp. 56, 59–60.
 Campbell, Lawrence. “Exhibition Review,” Art News, January 1971, p. 16.
 Edgar, Natalie. "Exhibition Review," Art/World Newspaper, April/May 1980.
 “Exhibition Review,” Arts Magazine, February 1971, p. 64.
 “Exhibition Review,” Art News, April 1992, p. 123.
 “Exhibition Review,” Art News, September 1980, p. 242.
 Artists’ Christmas Cards—A Collection of Original Holiday Greetings, compiled by Steven Heller. New York: A&W Publishers, 1979. 
 Henry, Gerrit. “Exhibition Review,” Art News, September 1988.
 Gruen, John. “Exhibition Review,” New York Magazine, February 1971, p. 57.
 Kubovy, Michael. Cecile Gray Bazelon. New York City/Santa Fe, New Mexico: SNAP Editions LLC, 2008
 Kulterman, Ugo. New Realism. New York: New York Graphic Society, 1972.
       ——. Hypperrealisme. Paris: Editions du Chêne, 1972 (illus., p. 90).
 Lippard, R. Lucy. From the Center Feminist Essays on Women’s Art. New York: E. P. Dutton & Co., 1976, p. 58.
       ——. “Household Images in Art,” MS Magazine, March 1973, pp. 22–25.
 Nemser, Cindy. “The Close Up Vision—Representational Art, Part II,”Arts Magazine, May 1972, pp. 44–47 (illus., p. 46).
 Poroner, Palmer. “Interrelations: Art and Architecture,” Artspeak Press, April 1980.
 Rushworth, Katherine. "A little off kilter," The Post-Standard, November 10, 2013, p. 12.
 Singer, Clyde. “The World of Art—Colors Brilliant in Silk Screens,” The Youngstown Vindicator, Youngstown, Ohio, October 1978.
 Tannenbaum, Judith. “Exhibition Review,” Arts Magazine, February 1976.

See also 

 Pattern and Decoration
 Realism
 Irwin Bazelon

References

External links 

1927 births
Living people
American women painters
Artists from Cleveland
20th-century American women artists
21st-century American painters
Painters from New York (state)
Painters of architecture
21st-century American women artists